Faisal Rehman, commonly known as Faisal is a Pakistani film and television actor, screenwriter and director. 

He has worked in 36 films and many television shows.

Biography
Faisal Rehman's ancestors hail from Afghanistan with roots in the Mohammadzai clan of Kabul belonging to Barakzai branch of the Durrani confederacy. His ancestors moved to India in 1905 during British Raj. His father Massud-ur-Rehman was a cinematographer, himself the younger brother of noted Bollywood actor Rehman, while his own brother Fasih Ur Rehman is a classical dancer.

Faisal did his secondary schooling at St. Anthony High School Lahore.

Career

He was only a 14-year-old boy when he landed his first role in Nazar-ul-Islam's 1980 film Nahi Abhi Nahi, also starring famous film actress Shabnam.

He is also one of the founding members of "The Actors' Collective (ACT)", an association of actors, including film, theatre and televisions artists in Pakistan, established in 2009 and based in Lahore.

Filmography

Films

1980: Nahin Abhi Nahin - best known for his role as Mani
1981: Aladdin, Yeh Zamana Aur Hay
1982: Biwi Ho To Aisee
1983: Nadani (Pakistan-Bangladesh joint venture film), Tina
1984: Love Story, Miss Colombo, Doorian
1986 Beqarar Babra sharif and Fasial
1985: Aaposh, Mehek, Naraaz, Jeenay Nahi Doon Gee, Palkon Ki Chaon Main
1986: Dhanak, Miss Singapore, Beqarar, Baat Baan Jay
1987: Girebaan, Qasam Munnay Ki
1988: Chakkar, Bazar-e-Husn
1990: Bulandi
1991: Aandhi, Piyaar Aur Pasa
1999: Ghadaar, Guns and Roses - Ik Junoon
2014: Kanebaaz, Bawanshah

Television career

As a writer and director
2002: Kaali Shalwar – Rehman was the Co-writer and director for this film along with Bilal Minto. This telefilm is an adaptation of Sadat Manto's work and was produced for Indus TV.
2004: Javaid Shampoo – Screened at 4th KaraFilm Festival received Ciepie for Special Jurors' Selection. The telefilm was also screened at Rafi Peer World Performing Arts Festival.
2009: HOME...written and directed...hum TV

Awards
 2003 Indus Telefilm Festival third Winner: Best TV Film and Director for World Ka Center
 2005 The 1st Indus Drama Awards: Nominated for Best Actor Drama Series

See also
 Ismael Shah, the first dancing hero of Pakistan

References

External links

Faisal Rehman Interview
Faisal Rehman Drama

Pakistani television directors
Living people
Male actors from Lahore
University of the Punjab alumni
Forman Christian College alumni
Pakistani male film actors
Pakistani male television actors
Nigar Award winners
St. Anthony's High School, Lahore alumni
Pakistani people of Afghan descent
1966 births